This is a list of people who have served as mayor of the city of Newport News, Virginia.

See also
 Timeline of Newport News, Virginia

References
"Mayors, City of Newport News," provided by Newport News Office of Intergovernmental and Community Relations, 2005

Newport News, Virginia